Lake Geneva (rarely  ; ;) is a deep lake on the north side of the Alps, shared between Switzerland and France. It is one of the largest lakes in Western Europe and the largest on the course of the Rhône. Sixty per cent of the lake belongs to Switzerland (the cantons of Vaud, Geneva and Valais) and forty per cent to France (the department of Haute-Savoie).

Name 
While the exact origins of the name are unknown, the name  was in use during the time of Julius Caesar.  comes from Ancient Greek  meaning "port's lake". Following the rise of Geneva it became  (translated into English as Lake Geneva), but  was the common name on all local maps and is the customary name in the French language. In contemporary English, the name Lake Geneva has become predominant.

Geography
Lake Geneva is divided into three parts because of its different types of formation (sedimentation, tectonic folding, glacial erosion): 
  ('Upper Lake'), the eastern part from the Rhône estuary to the line of Meillerie–Rivaz
  ('Large Lake'), the largest and deepest basin with the lake's largest width
  ('Small Lake'), the most south-west, narrower and less deep part from Yvoire–Promenthoux next Prangins to the exit in Geneva

The Chablais Alps border is its southern shore, the western Bernese Alps lie over its eastern side. The high summits of Grand Combin and Mont Blanc are visible from some places.  (CGN) operates boats on the lake.

The lake lies on the course of the Rhône. The river has its source at the Rhône Glacier near the Grimsel Pass to the east of the lake and flows down through the canton of Valais, entering the lake between Villeneuve and Le Bouveret, before flowing slowly towards its egress at Geneva. Other tributaries are La Dranse, L'Aubonne, La Morges, La Venoge, La Vuachère, and La Veveyse.

Lake Geneva is the largest body of water in Switzerland, and greatly exceeds in size all others that are connected with the main valleys of the Alps. It is in the shape of a crescent, with the horns pointing south, the northern shore being , the southern shore  in length. The detritus of the Rhône has filled up this portion of the bed of the lake, and it appears that within the historical period the waters extended about  beyond the present eastern margin of the lake. The lake's surface is the lowest point of the cantons of Valais and Vaud. The culminating point of the lake's drainage basin is Monte Rosa at 4,634 metres above sea level.

The beauty of the shores of the lake and of the sites of many of the places near its banks has long been celebrated. However, it is only from the eastern end of the lake, between Vevey and Villeneuve, that the scenery assumes an Alpine character. On the south side the mountains of Savoy and Valais are for the most part rugged and sombre, while those of the northern shore fall in gentle vine-covered slopes, thickly set with villages and castles.

The snowy peaks of the Mont Blanc are shut out from the western end of the lake by the Voirons mountain, and from its eastern end by the bolder summits of the Grammont, Cornettes de Bise and Dent d'Oche, but are seen from Geneva, and between Nyon and Morges.

The shore between Nyon and Lausanne is called  because it is flatter. Between Lausanne and Vevey it is called Lavaux and is famous for its hilly vineyards.

Climate 

Bise
Lake Geneva (and particularly the lakeside parts of the city of Geneva) can be affected by the cold Bise, a northeasterly wind. This can lead to severe icing in winter. The strength of the Bise wind can be determined by the difference in air pressure between Geneva and Güttingen in canton of Thurgau. The Bise arises when the air pressure in Güttingen is higher than in Geneva.

Environment

In 563, according to the writings of Gregory of Tours and Marius Aventicensis, a tsunami wave swept along the lake, destroying the fort of Tauredunum and other settlements, and causing numerous deaths in Geneva. In 888 the town was part of the new Kingdom of Burgundy, and, with it, was absorbed into the Holy Roman Empire in 1033.

In the late 1960s, pollution made it dangerous to swim at some beaches of the lake; indeed, visibility under water was near zero. By the 1980s, intense environmental pollution (eutrophication) had almost wiped out all the fish. Endemic whitefish species Coregonus fera was last recorded in the lake in 1920 and now extinct. Although the name fera is still used for the only coregonid present in the lake, this is not the original species but the introduced C.palaea. Today, pollution levels have been dramatically cut back, and it is again considered safe to swim in the lake. Major leisure activities practiced include sailing, wind surfing, boating (including water skiing and wake-boarding), rowing, scuba diving and bathing.

A total of four submarines have plied the depths of Lake Geneva.
In 1964, Jacques Piccard launched a tourist-oriented submarine, the Auguste Piccard (named for his explorer father), for the Swiss National Exhibition, meant to honor the Expo 64 theme of accomplishments by Swiss engineers and industry. After operating through to 1965 in Lake Geneva, Piccard used the vessel for scientific exploration in other parts of the world. Piccard later built the F.-A. Forel, launched in Lake Geneva in 1978 and used primarily for scientific research until it was retired in 2005. In 2011, in a collaborative operation led by École Polytechnique Fédérale de Lausanne, two Mir submersibles were used for ten weeks to conduct extensive scientific research in Lake Geneva.

On a scientific footnote, in 1827, Lake Geneva was the site for the first measurement of the speed of sound in (fresh) water.  French mathematician Jacques Charles François Sturm and Swiss physicist Daniel Collodon used two moored boats, separated by a measured distance, as the transmit and receive platforms for the sounds of exploding gunpowder.  The loud airborne sound coupled into the lake, establishing a loud underwater sound that could be measured at a distance.  The flash of the exploding gunpowder provided the visual starting cue for the timepiece, and the underwater explosion sound striking a bell provided the finish cue.

The lake is rich in wildlife, especially birds: both the common buzzard and the red kite  breed  here in considerable numbers.

Sport events 
Yacht racing is a popular sport, and high-performance catamarans have been developed specifically for the lake. The design of the Alinghi 5, the defender of the 2010 America's Cup, was influenced by those racing catamarans.

The  rowing event also takes place on Lake Geneva. Competitors row once around the entire lake, making this  event the longest non-stop rowing regatta in the world.

Towns and villages

Topographic map

Notable residents 

Edmund Ludlow, famous as one who had signed the death warrant of English King Charles I, was granted on 16 April 1662 protection in and continued to live at Vevey until his death in 1692. 
Mary and Percy Shelley and Lord Byron holidayed by the lake and wrote ghost stories, one of which became the basis for the novel Frankenstein. The Empress Elisabeth of Austria (Sisi) was stabbed to death on the quayside in Geneva in September 1898. Vladimir Lenin rented a little "chalet" at the French bank, near Geneva. Actor Charlie Chaplin spent his final years and died in Vevey (there is a memorial statue of him along the promenade; his home at Corsier-sur-Vevey is now a museum of his life and career). Actors Noël Coward, James Mason, Sir Peter Ustinov, Richard Burton and Audrey Hepburn all lived in villages on the shores of or in view of the lake.  David Bowie moved to a chalet to the north of Lake Geneva in 1976, which inspired him to take up painting and informed the first stages of the "Berlin Trilogy". Pop singer Phil Collins lives in a home overlooking the lake.  Rock band Queen owned and operated Mountain Recording Studios (which is still in use today) in Montreux, and a statue of lead singer Freddie Mercury, who also owned a second home in Montreux, stands on the northern shore of the lake. Writer Vladimir Nabokov also took residence in Montreux, where he died in 1977. Ex-Formula 1 driver Michael Schumacher lives with his family in a home overlooking the lake.

See also 
 Lake Geneva region

References

External links 

Lake Geneva Region
International Commission for the Protection of Lake Geneva (CIPEL)

 
Geneva
Geneva
Geneva
Ramsar sites in Switzerland
Ramsar sites in Metropolitan France
Geneva
Tourism in Auvergne-Rhône-Alpes
Geneva
Geneva
France–Switzerland border
Geneva
Tourist attractions in the canton of Geneva
Valais–Vaud border